Jimmy Martin (born October 19, 1982) is a former American football tackle. He played college football at Virginia Tech where he was a four-year starter. He was drafted in the seventh round of the 2006 NFL Draft, pick 227.

References

External links
Career transactions

1982 births
Living people
American football centers
Virginia Tech Hokies football players
San Diego Chargers players
Minnesota Vikings players
New England Patriots players
Players of American football from Virginia
Sportspeople from Fairfax, Virginia
Rhein Fire players
Chantilly High School alumni